Valeri Dydykin (born March 4, 1986) is a Russian professional ice hockey defenceman. He is currently playing with HC Donbass in the Kontinental Hockey League (KHL).

Dydykin played three seasons in the Kontinental Hockey League, most recently playing with Metallurg Novokuznetsk during the 2010–11 KHL season.

References

External links

1986 births
Living people
Metallurg Novokuznetsk players
Russian ice hockey defencemen
HC Donbass players
Traktor Chelyabinsk players
HC Lada Togliatti players